Henry Turpin (1836 - 1905) was a house painter and state legislator in the U.S. state of Virginia. His father was white. He served from 1871 to 1873 in the Virginia House of Delegates. He moved to the Bronx in New York City, married, worked as a porter, and had a daughter.

He was involved in a contested election. Edmund S. Pendleton was determined to have beaten him in the 1873 election.

He and his seven brothers and sisters were freed by their father, most in 1855. Eric Foner documented him as a carpenter in Freedom's Lawmakers.
→

References

1836 births
1905 deaths
Members of the Virginia House of Delegates